"Third Rail" is the first single released from Squeeze's tenth album, Some Fantastic Place. It was the first Squeeze song to crack the Top 40 in the UK since 1987's "Hourglass", peaking at number 39.

Track listing

7" vinyl and cassette
 "Third Rail" (3:39)
 "Cool For Cats (live medley)" (6:21)

CD
 "Third Rail" (3:39)
 "Take Me I'm Yours (Paul Dakeyne remix)" (6:47)
 "Cool For Cats (live medley)" (6:21)

CD (digipak)
 "Third Rail" (3:39)
 "The Truth [live London, March 1993]" (5:05)
 "Melody Motel [live London, March 1993]" (4:25)
 "Walk A Straight Line [live London, May 1992]" (4:10)

References

External links
Squeeze discography at Squeezenet

Squeeze (band) songs
1993 singles
Songs written by Glenn Tilbrook
Songs written by Chris Difford
1993 songs